Hawkinsville, California is an unincorporated community located about two miles (3.2 km) north of Yreka.  It is 2,490 feet (759 m) above sea level.

2016 Grade Fire
On August 24, 2016, a fire broke out near the community and burned over 400 acres just two miles north of town.

References

External links
 Hawkinsville Hall Association Facebook page

Unincorporated communities in Siskiyou County, California
Unincorporated communities in California